João Batista do Nascimento Carvalho (born 23 June 1979), known as Valdin, is a Brazilian futsal player who plays as a winger for Esporte Clube URCA JN and the Brazilian national futsal team. Valdin holds the record of the most goals scored in a single international game, when he scored 20 goals in a 76-0 win over Timor-Leste in the 2006 Lusophony Games.

References

External links
Liga Nacional de Futsal profile

1979 births
Living people
Brazilian men's futsal players
Brazilian athletes
Sportspeople from Fortaleza
Pan American Games gold medalists for Brazil
Futsal players at the 2007 Pan American Games
Medalists at the 2007 Pan American Games
Pan American Games medalists in futsal